Provincial Highway 28 is a Taiwanese highway that starts from Hunei and ends in Liouguei. The highway is entirely located in Kaohsiung City.

Route description
The highway begins at Hunei at the intersection with Highway 17. The highway heads eastbound and serves as the main highway in Tianliao, Cishan, and Meinong. The road ends at Laonong (荖濃) in Liouguei District at the intersection with Highway 27.

See also
 Highway system in Taiwan

References

External links

Highways in Taiwan